Tethida is a genus of common sawflies in the family Tenthredinidae. There is one described species in Tethida, T. barda.

References

External links

Tenthredinidae
Articles created by Qbugbot